Wind power generation capacity in India has significantly increased in recent years. As of 31 January 2023, the total installed wind power capacity was 41.983 gigawatts (GW), the fourth largest installed wind power capacity in the world. Wind power capacity is mainly spread across the southern, western, and northwestern states.

Wind power costs in India are decreasing rapidly. In December 2017, union government announced the applicable guidelines for tariff-based wind power auctions to bring more clarity and minimise the risk to the developers. Wind power installations occupy only 2% of the wind farm area facilitating rest of the area for agriculture, plantations, etc.

National Wind power potential 
The Indian government has installed over 800 wind-monitoring stations all over the country through the National Institute of Wind Energy (NIWE) and issued wind potential maps at 50m, 80m, 100m, and 120m above ground level. The recent assessment indicates a gross wind power potential of 302 GW in the country at 100 meters and 695.50 GW at 120 meters above ground level. The estimated potential is found on the higher side as the present installed capacity is operating below 20% CUF on average against the minimum 30% CUF considered while assessing the wind potential.

Installed capacity 
The table below shows India's year on year installed wind power, annual wind power generation and annual growth in wind power generation since 2006. Wind power generation in India ranks fifth globally in 2021.

History 

Development of wind power in India began in December 1952, when Maneklal Sankalchand Thacker, a distinguished power engineer, initiated a project with the Indian Council of Scientific and Industrial Research (CSIR) to explore the possibilities of harnessing wind power in the country. The CSIR established a Wind Power Sub-Committee under P. Nilakantan, which was assigned the task of investigating the available resources that could be practically utilised, along with researching the economic possibilities of wind energy. With assistance from the Indian Meteorological Department, the Sub-Committee extensively reviewed available data on surface winds in India and their velocity duration, and began detailed surveys of promising sites for harnessing the optimum amount of wind energy; it also successfully developed and tested large wood-and-bamboo windmills.

In September 1954, a Symposium on Solar Energy and Wind Power organised by the CSIR and UNESCO was held in New Delhi; among the attendees was E. W. Golding, a British power engineer and authority on wind energy generation. Convinced of the potential of wind power in India, he recommended continued and extensive wind velocity surveys in different regions of India, the full-time assignment of staff to experimental wind power studies, the establishment of a dedicated research laboratory and development of small to medium-sized wind-powered electrical generators. Golding's recommendations were adopted by the CSIR in 1957. By this time, regions of Saurashtra and around Coimbatore had been identified as promising sites for generating electricity from wind power, and the Wind Power Sub-Committee had begun to erect 20 wind velocity survey stations across India, in addition to testing its indigenously designed windmills and obtaining a 6 kW. Allgaier wind turbine, which was presented to India by the West German government; experiments at Porbandar with the latter had commenced by 1961. The Indian government also considered a proposal to erect over 20,000 small to medium-sized wind-powered electrical generators in rural districts, to be used for powering water pumps and supplying electricity for remotely situated structures such as lighthouses.

In 1960, the CSIR established a Wind Power Division as part of the new National Aeronautical Laboratory (NAL) in Bangalore, which was founded that year. From the 1960s into the 1980s, the NAL and other groups continued to carry out wind velocity surveys and develop improved estimates of India's wind energy capacity. Large-scale development of wind power began in 1985 with the first wind project in Veraval, Gujarat, in the form of a 40-kW Dutch machine (make Polenko) connected to the grid.  The project, an initiative of late Dr. K S Rao, the then Director of GEDA (Gujarat Energy Development Agency), was a joint venture between GEDA and J K Synthetics Ltd. Though the performance of this machine was quite poor, it established the technical viability of operating wind turbines in the grid-connected mode in India. Subsequently, the Government of India planned several demonstration wind farms in the coastal regions of the country and simultaneously launched a massive programme to identify sites suitable for wind projects. In 1986, demonstration wind farms were set up in the coastal areas of Maharashtra (Ratnagiri), Gujarat (Okha) and Tamil Nadu (Tirunelveli) with 55 kW Vestas wind turbines. These demonstration projects were supported by the Ministry of New and Renewable Energy (MNRE). The demonstration projects set up in 1985–86 established beyond doubt, both the technical and economic viability of the wind energy projects, while the wind-mapping programme resulted in the identification of many sites suitable for wind power projects (C-WET 2001; Mani 1990, 1992, 1994; Mani and Mooley 1983).

The potential for wind farms in the country was first assessed in 2011 to be more than 2,000 GW by Prof. Jami Hossain of TERI University, New Delhi.
This was subsequently re-validated by Lawrence Berkley National Laboratory, US (LBNL) in an independent study in 2012. 
As a result, the MNRE set up a committee to reassess the potential and through the National Institute of Wind Energy (NIWE, previously C-WET) has announced a revised estimation of the potential wind resource in India from 49,130 MW to 302,000 MW assessed at 100 m hub height. Wind turbines are now being set up at even 120 m hub height and the wind resource at higher hub heights of around 120 m or more that are prevailing is possibly even more.

In 2015, the MNRE set the target for Wind Power generation capacity by 2022 at 60,000 MW.

East and Northeast regions have no grid-connected wind power plant as of December 2017.

No offshore wind farm is under implementation as of December 2017. 
However, an Offshore Wind Policy was announced in 2015 and presently weather stations and Lidars are being set up by NIWE at some locations. 
The first offshore wind farm is planned near Dhanushkodi in Tamil Nadu.

Electricity generation 
Wind power accounts for nearly 10% of India's total installed power generation capacity and generated 62.03 TWh in the fiscal year 2018–19, which is nearly 4% of total electricity generation. The capacity utilisation factor is nearly 19.33%  in the fiscal year 2018–19 (16% in 2017–18, 19.62% in 2016–17 and 14% in 2015–16). 70% of annual wind generation is during the five months duration from May to September coinciding with Southwest monsoon duration.
In India, solar power is complementary to wind power as it is generated mostly during the non-monsoon period in daytime. Nearly 60% of the wind power is generated during the night time which is equal to the stored solar power in terms of price.

Wind power by state

There is a growing number of wind energy installations in states across India.

Tamil Nadu
Tamil Nadu's wind production capacity was around 24% of India's total in 2021.The Government of Tamil Nadu realised the importance and need for renewable energy, and set up a separate Agency, as a registered society, called the Tamil Nadu Energy Development Agency (TEDA) as early as 1985. 
Tamil Nadu is a leader in Wind Power in India. The largest capacity wind turbine of 4.2 MW is installed in Tamil Nadu state as of October 2022.
In Muppandal windfarm, the total capacity is 1500 MW with nearly 3000 wind turbines, the largest wind power plant in India. The total wind installed capacity in Tamil Nadu is 7633 MW. 
During the fiscal year 2014–15, the electricity generation is 9.521 GWh, with about a 15% capacity utilisation factor.

Gujarat
Gujarat government's focus on tapping renewable energy has led to a sharp rise in the wind power capacity in the last few years. According to official data, wind power generation capacity in the state has increased a staggering ten times in the last six years. Gujarat has around 22% of the total capacity of the country. Renewable energy projects worth a massive Rs 1 trillion (short scale) of memorandums of understanding (MoUs) in the Vibrant Gujarat Summit in 2017. The largest wind turbine of 5.2 MW capacity at 120 meters hub height was installed in the state as of November 2022.

At the end of March 2021, Tamil Nadu’s total wind capacity was 9608 MW, while Gujarat’s capacity was nearly 1,000 MW lower at 8562 MW. However, by the end of January, 2023, Gujarat’s total wind power capacity rose to 9,919 MW, while Tamil Nadu’s installed wind energy capacity stood at 9964 MW. In the current fiscal, Gujarat has added 710 MW, while Tamil Nadu’s addition was just 99 MW.

Maharashtra
As of the end of March 2016, the installed wind power capacity is 4655.25 MW . As of now there are 50 developers registered with the state nodal agency "Maharashtra Energy Development Agency" for the development of wind power projects. All the major manufacturers of wind turbines including ReNew Power, Suzlon, Vestas, Gamesa, Regen, and Leitner Shriram have a presence in Maharashtra.

Rajasthan
4298 MW wind power plant has been installed in Rajasthan.

Madhya Pradesh
In consideration of a unique concept, Govt. of Madhya Pradesh has sanctioned another 15 MW project to Madhya Pradesh Windfarms Ltd. MPWL, Bhopal at Nagda Hills near Dewas under consultation from Consolidated Energy Consultants Ltd. CECL Bhopal. All 25 WEGs have been commissioned on 31 March 2008 and are under successful operation.

Kerala
55 MW production of wind power is installed in Kerala. The first wind farm of the state was set up in 1997 at Kanjikode in Palakkad district.

The agency has identified 16 sites for setting up wind farms through private developers.

Odisha
Odisha a coastal state has a higher potential for wind energy. The current installed capacity stands at 2.0 MW. Odisha has a wind power potential of 1700MW. The Govt of Odisha is actively pursuing to boost Wind power generation. However, it has not progressed like other states primarily because Odisha having a huge coal reserve and a number of existing and upcoming thermal power plants, is a power surplus state.

West Bengal
The total installation in West Bengal is 2.10 MW till Dec 2009 at Fraserganj, Distt- South 24 Paraganas. More 0.5 MW (approx) at Ganga Sagar, Kakdwip, Distt – South 24 Paraganas. Both the project owned by the West Bengal Renewable Energy Development Agency (WBREDA), Govt. of WB, and the project was executed on a turnkey basis by Utility Powertech Limited (UPL).

Ladakh 
The union territory of Ladakh and its Kargil district are potential wind energy areas, which are yet to be exploited. Wind Speeds are higher during the winter months in Ladakh, which is complementary to the hydropower available during the summer months from the snow melt water. Being a Himalayan region located at a higher altitude, the heating energy requirements are high which can be met by renewable energy resources such as wind, solar and hydropower. The union territory is yet to open its account in grid-connected wind power installations.

Projects
India's largest wind power production facilities (10MW and greater)

Repowering wind power projects
The union government has released a draft policy for the repowering of wind power projects which states that the repowering potential is nearly 25,406 MW. The policy includes the installation of additional wind turbines, of minimum 3 MW capacity each with hub heights above 120 meters, located in between the existing wind turbines in place of few existing turbines without any effect on one another's performance. Increasing the hub height also increases the average wind speed captured by the turbine, thanks to the wind profile power law. Spacing between wind turbines in a wind farm can be optimised by yaw control minimising the wake effect.

Additional electricity can be produced by covering the south-facing façade area of the wind turbine towers/masts with solar panels up to the rotor bottom tip height at an economical price.

Offshore wind power plants
India has an offshore wind energy potential of around 70 GW in parts along the coast of Gujarat and Tamil Nadu. As of May 2022, there is no offshore wind project under construction or operation.

India started planning in 2010 to enter into offshore wind power, and a 100 MW demonstration plant located off the Gujarat coast began planning in 2014. In 2013, a consortium (instead of a group of organisations), led by Global Wind Energy Council (GWEC) started project FOWIND (Facilitating Offshore Wind in India) to identify potential zones for development of offshore wind power in India and to stimulate R & D activities in this area. The other consortium partners include the Centre for Study of Science, Technology and Policy (CSTEP), DNV GL, the Gujarat Power Corporation Limited (GPCL) and the World Institute of Sustainable Energy (WISE). The consortium was awarded a grant of €4.0 million by the delegation of the European Union to India in 2013 besides co-funding support from GPCL. The project activities will be implemented from December 2013 to March 2018.

The project focuses on the States of Gujarat and Tamil Nadu for the identification of potential zones for development through techno-commercial analysis and preliminary resource assessment. It will also establish a platform for structural collaboration and knowledge sharing between stakeholders from European Union and India, on offshore wind technology, policy, regulation, industry, and human resource development. FOWIND activities will also help facilitate a platform to stimulate offshore wind-related R&D activities in the country. The consortium published initial pre-feasibility assessment reports for offshore wind farm development in Gujarat and Tamil Nadu on 16 June 2015.
In September 2015, India's cabinet has approved the National Offshore Wind Energy Policy. With this, the Ministry of New & Renewable Energy (MNRE) has been authorised as the Nodal Ministry for use of offshore areas within the Exclusive Economic Zone (EEZ)

India seems pacing up rapidly towards offshore wind energy development as the Nodal Ministry (MNRE) & Nodal Agency (NIWE) calls with the Expression of Interest (EoI) inviting the bidders for development of first 1000MW commercial-scale offshore wind farm in India, near the coast of Gujarat. The EoI published on 16 April 2018, specifies the proposed area identified under the FOWIND & FOWPI study funded by European Union. The proposed location of the offshore wind farm could be 23–40 km off the coast from the Pipavav port, Gulf of Khambhat. The proposed area covers about 400sq km. The wind measurements & other data collection are in progress under the supervision of NIWE.

See also

 Renewable energy in India
 Electricity sector in India
 Energy policy of India
Solar power in India
List of onshore wind farms
Wind turbine design
Floating wind turbine
Hydroelectric power in India
Biofuel in India
 Wind power by country
Renewable energy by country

References

External links

How winds of change could be an alternative to coal
Energy-hungry India eyes role as "wind superpower"
Indian Wind Power – Magazine

 
India